Prays ruficeps is a moth of the family Plutellidae. It is found in Northern and Central Europe.

The wingspan is 14–17 mm.

The larvae feed on ash (Fraxinus excelsior).

References
Aaarvik, L. et al. ,2017 Nordic-Baltic Checklist of Lepidoptera. Norwegian Journal of Entomology - Supplement No. 3: 1–236. 
Heinemann, 1854): Zehn neue Microlepidoptern. Zeitschrift für Entomologie im Auftrage des Vereins für schlesische Insektenkunde zu Breslau 8: 1–7. Breslau (J. Urban Kern).
Huemer, P., 2013  Die Schmetterlinge Österreichs (Lepidoptera). Systematische und faunistische Checkliste. Studiohefte 12: 1–304.

External links
Swedish Moths

Plutellidae
Moths of Europe
Moths described in 1854
Taxa named by Hermann von Heinemann